Martis Karin Ersdotter (Våmhus, 2 July 1829 – 5 January 1902, Våmhus) was a Swedish businesswoman from Våmhus in Dalarna. She is the best known of the Hårkulla ("Hair-kulla"), the famous category of travelling businesswomen from Dalarna who manufactured and sold hair jewellery all over Europe in the 19th century.

As other hårkullor, she made business trips in Europe to sell her products, and she was to become perhaps the most successful of these. She was a supplier of hair jewellery to Queen Victoria, whom she met during a business trip to Scotland. She used the fact that the queen was her client in her business and had it printed on her business cards, many of which are preserved from the 1850s.

She was married to Martis Mats Andersson and was the mother of Anna Matsdotter (1862-1943) and the maternal grandmother of Eric Wickman.

References
 Kristin Lundell: Busskungen – Svensken som grundade Greyhound (Stockholm 2014)
 Petra Martinsson: "Resande i hår" i Populär historia nr 5 2000 (publicerad på nätet 2002-03-18).
 ”Kullan blev rik på hår”. företagsamheten.se. Arkiverad från originalet den 2 maj 2015.

1829 births
1902 deaths
19th-century Swedish businesswomen
19th-century Swedish businesspeople
Queen Victoria
Swedish fashion designers
Swedish women fashion designers